Denny Setiawan (born 9 September 1980) is an Indonesian badminton player who later represented Singapore. Setiawan joined the PB Djarum club in 2006, and now works as a badminton coach. Setiawan was part of the Indonesia junior team that competed at the 1997 and 1998 Asian Junior Championships, winning a silver and four bronze medals. He had won some international senior tournament in Asian Satellite and also in Oceania, and the 2003 Waikato International tournament impressed him, by defeating the top seeds Keita Masuda and Tadashi Ohtsuka, of Japan.

Achievements

Asian Junior Championships 
Boys' doubles

Mixed doubles

IBF International (6 titles, 2 runners-up) 
Men's doubles

Mixed doubles

References

External links 
 

1980 births
Living people
Sportspeople from Surabaya
Singaporean male badminton players
Indonesian male badminton players